Viktor Lundberg (born 4 March 1991) is a Swedish footballer who plays for Helsingborgs IF. Mainly a forward, he can also operate as a midfielder.

Career

AIK 
Viktor came through AIK's youth ranks from an early age. In 2008, he was placed in AIK's feeder club FC Väsby United to get senior team experience.

2009 
In March 2009 he rejoined AIK but this time to play with the first team. His debut was against fellow Stockholm team IF Brommapojkarna, in which he scored his first goal. He took place in the starting eleven and it took less than two minutes until he scored. He made a total of six appearances for AIK in the league this year, and one appearance in the Swedish Cup. For the rest of 2009 he was once again loaned out to Väsby United, where he made two goals in 12 appearances.

2010 
During 2010 he made his big breakthrough in AIK. Even though he was just nineteen years old, he managed to make 22 appearances, in 12 of these he was in the starting-eleven. In these appearances he managed to make four goals and one assist. On 21 July he made his first European-staged game, coming on as a substitute against Jeunesse Esch in the qualifying stage of the UEFA Champions League.

2011 
In 2011, AIK made a very good season and finished second in Allsvenskan. The season wasn't equally good for Lundberg, even though he managed to make 24 appearances. During a few weeks he was troubled by an injury, and only managed to score two goals during the season.

2012 
During 2012, Lundberg made a much better season then the previous. In Allsvenskan he managed to make five goals and five assist, in 27 appearances. In round two of the Swedish Cup, he made the game-winning goal against Torslanda IK, therefore qualifying AIK for the group stage of the cup. He also had great success in the UEFA Europa League, making a total of 11 appearances, during which he managed to score on two occasions; against polish side Lech Poznań, and Icelandic side FH. He also made three assist during the European campaign.

Randers
In the summer of 2013, Lundberg transferred to the Danish club Randers FC for an undisclosed fee from Swedish side AIK Fotboll. He left the club in the summer of 2017.

Marítimo 
On 29 June 2017, Lundberg signed a three years contract with Marítimo

BK Häcken
Lundberg was acquired by BK Häcken on a 3-year contract, making his second stint in Allsvenskan

Helsingborgs IF
On 11 February 2021, Lundberg signed a three-year contract with Helsingborg.

Career statistics

Honours
AIK
 Allsvenskan: 2009
 Svenska Cupen: 2009
 Svenska Supercupen: 2010

References

External links

 

1991 births
Living people
Swedish footballers
Sweden youth international footballers
Sweden under-21 international footballers
Allsvenskan players
Superettan players
Primeira Liga players
Danish Superliga players
AIK Fotboll players
AFC Eskilstuna players
Randers FC players
C.S. Marítimo players
BK Häcken players
Helsingborgs IF players
Swedish expatriate footballers
Expatriate men's footballers in Denmark
Swedish expatriate sportspeople in Denmark
Expatriate footballers in Portugal
Swedish expatriate sportspeople in Portugal
People from Solna Municipality
Association football forwards
Sportspeople from Stockholm County